Greyia sutherlandii, also known as Natal bottlebrush, is a species of plant in the Francoaceae family. It is endemic to South Africa.

References

External links
 PlantZAfrica.com
 KZN Wildlife

Endemic flora of South Africa
sutherlandii